Bhojaraj Vamanjoor is an Indian actor, who predominantly works in Tulu theatre and Tulu film industry. Vamanjoor is also a Yakshagana Artist. He is one of the active members of the Tulu drama troupe "Cha Parka Kalavidher Kudla"  along with Devadas Kapikad, Naveen D. Padil and Aravind Bolar. He can be seen in most Tulu plays directed by Devadas Kapikad.

He has been honoured with "Jilla Rajyotsava Prashasti" on the occasion of Karnataka Rajyotsava 2014 in Mangalore for his achievement in theatre. Gamjaal is one of his recent movies.

Filmography
Kadala Mage
Oriyardori Asal
Sompa
Bangarda Kural
Amait Asal Emait Kusal
Telikeda Bolli
Chellapilli (Kannada film)
Rang
Madime
Chaali Polilu
Soombe
Ekka Saka
Oriyan Thoonda Oriyagapuji
Jokulatike
Chandi Kori
Super Marmaye
Eregla Panodchi
Golmaal
Pencil Box
Odeya (film)
Magane Mahisha

References

External links

 Bhojaraj Vamanjoor at BookMyShow

Living people
Male actors from Mangalore
Mangaloreans
Tulu people
Male actors in Kannada cinema
Indian male film actors
Male actors in Tulu cinema
21st-century Indian male actors
Year of birth missing (living people)